Amaya Seguros was a Spanish professional cycling team that existed from 1979 to 1993. Faustino Rupérez and Álvaro Pino won the 1980 and 1986 editions of the Vuelta a España, respectively.

References

External links

Cycling teams based in Spain
Defunct cycling teams based in Spain
1979 establishments in Spain
1993 disestablishments in Spain
Cycling teams established in 1979
Cycling teams disestablished in 1993